Ceratocorys is a genus of marine dinoflagellates first described in 1883. It is the only genus in the family Ceratocoryaceae.

References

Dinoflagellate genera
Gonyaulacales